St Michael's Secondary School was a mixed Free school located in Camborne, Cornwall, England. It opened in 2012, has a Roman Catholic ethos and caters for students aged 11–16 years. Due to a lack of pupil numbers it was merged with Camborne Science and International Academy and closed in 2017.

History
The school opened in 2012 as part of the first wave of free schools, but struggled to attract large numbers of students which would make it viable. It was located on the former Camborne Grammar School site.

In May 2015 the school's new sponsors – Camborne Science and International Academy – announced that it was not viable and would close.

Ofsted
In April 2014, the school had its first Ofsted inspection, which showed that it "Requires improvement". The inspectors noted that the quality of teaching, specifically teachers’ use of assessment, was too uneven to promote consistently good progress for all students.

References

External links 
 St Michael's Secondary School official site

`

Defunct schools in Cornwall
Educational institutions established in 2012
Educational institutions disestablished in 2017
2012 establishments in England
2017 disestablishments in England
Defunct free schools in England
Defunct Catholic schools in the Diocese of Plymouth